The great storm of 1868 was a violent storm that swept across much of New Zealand between 1–6 February 1868, wrecking 12 ships – including the Star of Tasmania and Water Nymph at Oamaru – and causing extensive flooding. About 40 lives were known lost and at the time an estimated £500,000 to £1 million worth of damage was caused. The storm is currently thought to have been an extratropical cyclone, which peaked in New Zealand over the period between the 3rd and 4th. In total 2,585 tons of shipping was lost, which was nearly half the tonnage lost during the full year. The flooding in the south of the South Island was the worst until 1945. The loss of life among the Maori population, if any, was not known as many lived in isolated areas, newspaper reporting of the time was Eurocentric, and at the time internal conflict, the New Zealand Wars, was reaching its culmination.

Origin
Between November and April, New Zealand can occasionally be exposed to tropical cyclones or their remnants. These typically originate in the vicinity of Vanuatu and Fiji. In the case of this storm, there was a cyclone reported in the New Hebrides (now Vanuatu) on 30 January 1868 which could have been its origin.

Meteorological readings
At the time the great storm struck there were a small number of meteorological observation stations around New Zealand under Dr. James Hector's Geological Survey of New Zealand. There was no ability for them, at that time, to know of the storms origin, approach, or intensity.

Barometric pressure
Barometric pressure recorded at Auckland on the 3 February was 955hPA. Blenheim and New Plymouth recorded a minimum of about 968hPA during this event. At Nelson the barometer fell from 30.10 deg to 20.60 deg in 24 hours. Barometric pressure on the West Coast fell to 980hPA.

Rainfall
Napier reported heavy rain commencing on the 2nd, but reducing to showers on the 3rd. Nelson recorded 12.91 inches of rain over the period 3–5 February, with 7.03 inches falling on the 5th. Bealey 3.07 inches in 24 hours and Christchurch 1.5 inches in the same period. Mount Peel homestead recorded 8.08 inches of rain over a 24-hour period. Dunedin had the heaviest rainfall it had known between the 4th and 5th.

Wind
Northland and the West Coast reported high winds and seas. On 1 February Auckland reported a cyclone of shore and winds at their highest since the settlement began in the 1840s. The wind was from an easterly quarter, changing to the north-west on the 5th. At Nelson gales demolished some buildings and uprooted numerous trees. Christchurch had a violent north-easterly gale with heavy rain on the 2nd. Lyttleton reported heavy gales on the 3rd.

Hail and tornadoes
Hail 1.5 inch in diameter was reported at Nelson and a waterspout was seen. Lightning was also reported at Nelson. There was a severe electrical storm at Dunedin on the 6th. On the 4th Invercargill was struck by a violent hail storm.

The ship Maori
The Maori a 703-ton sailing ship under Captain D T Roberts encountered the storm on the 31 January to the north of New Zealand in the vicinity of the Three Kings Islands, while sailing to Auckland from London. The day had begun with a reasonably calm sea, but the barometer had been falling from 30.30 the previous evening to 30.07 in at noon. The wind from the east was strengthening and sea became rougher. At 6pm the barometer had fallen to 30.00 and the sea was heavy with a strengthening gale. The gale continued to strengthen through the evening and by midnight the barometer had dropped to 29.96 with violent squalls and rain. Through the next day the wind turned towards the south and increased in intensity. By midnight the barometer had dropped to 29.30. At 4am on the 2 February the barometer dropped to 28.93, but the wind died away with the ship having reached the centre of the cyclone.  The barometer fell to its lowest point 28.82 at 2pm, with the wind beginning to return to cyclonic strength. Through the remainder of the day the wind gradually changed to a westerly direction. Through the night the wind began to drop in intensity and by the 3rd the weather had improved significantly.

Damage

Aftermath
The Canterbury Provincial government introduced legislation, Canterbury Rivers Act, in 1868 to allow the construction of protective works to address the flooding caused during this event by the Waimakariri River overtopping its banks and causing the nearby Avon River to flood.

In the arts
Bearing the same name, The Great Storm of 1868, was a 2008 play by New Zealand playwright and author Michelanne Forster based around the event.

See also
List of shipwrecks in 1868

References

1868 Great storm
1868 Great storm
1868 in New Zealand
1868 natural disasters
1868 meteorology
February 1868 events
Floods in New Zealand
Storms